Luc Mischo (born 17 September 1974) is a retired Luxembourgian footballer.

Club career
A prolific striker, Mischo played for Spora Luxembourg, Aris Bonnevoie, FC Etzella Ettelbruck and Racing FC Luxembourg in Luxembourg's domestic National Division in which he scored a total of 114 goals. Mischo played for Etzella Ettelbruck as the club lost the 2003–04 Luxembourg Cup final.

International career
Mischo made his debut for Luxembourg in a June 2001 World Cup qualification match against Slovenia, coming on as a second-half substitute for Daniel Huss. The game proved to be not only his first cap but also his last.

Honours
Luxembourg Cup: 1
 2001

External links

References

1974 births
Living people
Luxembourgian footballers
FC Etzella Ettelbruck players
Racing FC Union Luxembourg players
Association football forwards
Luxembourg international footballers